Louis Hébert (March 13, 1820 – January 20, 1901) was an American educator, civil engineer, writer and soldier who became a brigadier general in the Confederate States Army during the American Civil War.

Early life
Born in Iberville Parish, Louisiana, Louis Hébert was the first cousin of engineer, Governor Paul Octave Hébert. Louis Hébert graduated from the United States Military Academy in 1845 and was assigned as a brevet second lieutenant to the construction of Fort Livingston, Louisiana. He resigned his commission on February 15, 1846, to run his ailing father's plantation. He became a state militia officer in 1847, a Louisiana state legislator and chief engineer of the State of Louisiana (1855–1860).

American Civil War

Hébert was commissioned Colonel of the 3rd Louisiana Infantry Regiment on May 11, 1861. He fought with his regiment at the Battle of Wilson's Creek. He led Brigadier General Benjamin McCulloch's infantry brigade at the Pea Ridge on March 7, 1862, while McCulloch led the brigade's division. Hébert was technically in command of the division after McCulloch and his second in command, Brigadier General James M. McIntosh, were killed in action. However, Hébert, who was wounded, and a small group of his men had become separated from the brigade and were captured before Hebert could exercise command of the division.

Hébert was exchanged on March 20, 1862. On May 26, 1862, Hébert was appointed brigadier general. His appointment was confirmed by the Confederate Senate on September 30, 1862. He led a brigade in 1862 at the Battle of Iuka, a division at the Second Battle of Corinth and a brigade at the Siege of Vicksburg (May 18 – July 4, 1863).  He was again made a prisoner of war after the Confederate surrender at Vicksburg.  He was paroled and exchanged on October 13, 1863.  He then served in Confederate operations in the Cape Fear District in North Carolina first in artillery and then as chief engineer of the department. He commanded the heavy artillery at and around Fort Fisher.

Post-war

After the war Hébert was an editor and publisher of a local St. Martin's parish newspaper, Iberville South, and taught at several private schools.

Because his burial site was located on private land, with assistance from the Sons of Confederate Veterans on October 26, 2002, Hébert's remains were disinterred and moved to St. Joseph Catholic Cemetery in nearby Cecilia, Louisiana.

See also

List of American Civil War generals (Confederate)

Notes

References
 Account of Hébert's reburial and final memorial ceremony with photographs. Retrieved May 20, 2016.
 Brief biography, Pea Ridge National Park Service web site. Retrieved May 20, 2016.
 Boatner, Mark Mayo, III. The Civil War Dictionary. New York: McKay, 1988. . First published 1959 by McKay.
 Cullum, George W. George W. Cullum's Register of Officers and Graduates of the United States Military Academy. Vol. 2. 1879. . Cullum File #1233. p. 114. Retrieved January 12, 2011.
 Eicher, John H., and David J. Eicher, Civil War High Commands. Stanford: Stanford University Press, 2001. .
 Sifakis, Stewart. Who Was Who in the Civil War. New York: Facts On File, 1988. .
 Warner, Ezra J. Generals in Gray: Lives of the Confederate Commanders. Baton Rouge: Louisiana State University Press, 1959. .

1820 births
1901 deaths
People from Iberville Parish, Louisiana
Confederate States Army brigadier generals
United States Military Academy alumni
American engineers
People of Louisiana in the American Civil War
American Civil War prisoners of war